Andrey III Alexandrovich (ca. 1255 – 27 July 1304), a Russian prince, son of Alexander Nevsky, received from his father the town of Gorodets on the Volga. In 1276 he added Kostroma to his possessions and joined the struggle for the Grand Duchy of Vladimir-Suzdal.

In 1281 Andrey, joining the Mongol army, expelled his elder brother Dmitri from Vladimir. After some feasting with Mongols in Vladimir, Andrey went to Novgorod, where the populace made him heartily welcome. Meanwhile, his brother allied himself with the powerful Nogai Khan, who reinstated Dmitry as Grand Duke of Vladimir in 1283.

During the following decade, Andrey thrice brought the Mongols to Russia in order to wrest Vladimir from his brother. In the campaign of 1293 they pillaged 14 Russian towns, finally forcing Dmitry to abdicate. Even when elevated to the grand-ducal throne of Vladimir, Andrey continued to live in Gorodets. In 1301 he drove the Swedes from Landskrona near present-day Saint Petersburg.

See also
 Family tree of Russian monarchs

References  

1250s births
1304 deaths
Grand Princes of Vladimir
Rurik dynasty
Yurievichi family
Eastern Orthodox monarchs
13th-century princes in Kievan Rus'
14th-century Russian princes